Marcus Daniell and Philipp Oswald were the defending champions, but chose to compete in Marbella instead.

Lorenzo Sonego and Andrea Vavassori won the title, defeating Simone Bolelli and Andrés Molteni in the final, 6–3, 6–4.

Seeds

Draw

Draw

References

External Links
Main Draw

Sardegna Open - Doubles
Sardegna Open